Sekake Airport  is an airport serving the village of Sekake, Lesotho.

The airstrip sits atop a mesa with steep dropoffs at both ends.

The Google Map link has Sekake village labelled with its community council name of ′Patlong′

See also
Transport in Lesotho
List of airports in Lesotho

References

External links
 Sekake Airport
 OurAirports - Sekake
OpenStreetMap - Sekakes
 Google Earth

Airports in Lesotho